Bavarian Nordic A/S is a fully integrated biotechnology company focused on the development, manufacturing and commercialization of vaccines for infectious diseases and cancer immunotherapies. The company is headquartered in Hellerup, Denmark, with a manufacturing facility in Kvistgård, and an additional site in Hørsholm. The company has a research and development facility in Martinsried, Germany, and offices in Zug, Switzerland, and Morrisville, North Carolina. The company uses viral vectors in its research and development.

Technologies

MVA-BN 
MVA-BN is a proprietary technology developed by Bavarian Nordic. It is derived from the Modified vaccinia Ankara virus. MVA-BN is characterized by the inability to replicate in human cells, contrary to other vaccinia-based vaccines, which may replicate in humans, thus potentially causing severe and life-threatening side effects. Developed as the non-replicating smallpox and monkeypox vaccine, MVA-BN is approved in Canada as Imvamune, in the European Union, as Imvanex, and the United States as 
Jynneos. The vaccine was supplied for emergency use to the U.S. Strategic National Stockpile as well as other government stockpiles.

The vaccine is being deployed worldwide to combat the 2022 monkeypox outbreak, leading to concerns over vaccine nationalism and hoarding by countries with pre-existing contracts.

Vaccinia-fowlpox-TRICOM 
A second poxvirus-based technology is employed in most of the company's cancer immunotherapies, and was in-licensed as part of a collaboration with the National Cancer Institute (NCI). Vaccinia-fowlpox-TRICOM is a sequential prime-boost therapy based on vaccinia and fowlpox in combination with three co-stimulatory molecules (TRICOM). The poxvirus-based immunotherapy can be modified to encode different tumor-associated antigens such as Prostate-specific antigen (PSA), Carcinoembryonic antigen (CEA) and/or Mucin 1 (MUC1), which are all tumor markers that are overexpressed in various cancers. This technology formed the basis of the company's lead oncology product candidates, Prostvac and CV-301.

Ebola vaccine development and production 

The company has worked for several years with the NIAID on the development of a filovirus vaccine for Ebola and Marburg hemorrhagic fever diseases. In October 2014, following a successful pre-clinical demonstration of the combination vaccine regimen of its multivalent MVA-BN Filovirus vaccine and Crucell/Janssen's AdVac technology based on adenoviral vectors, Bavarian Nordic joined efforts with Crucell Holland B.V., one of the Janssen Pharmaceuticals companies of Johnson & Johnson to develop and manufacture this vaccine regimen intended for emergency use to help contain the outbreak in West Africa. In January 2015, the company had produced the first 400,000 doses of the vaccine and the first clinical trial of the vaccine regimen was initiated in the UK, with additional trials planned in the US and Africa. It was approved for medical use in the European Union in July 2020.

Acquisitions

In October 2019, it was announced that Bavarian Nordic would acquire travel vaccines Rabipur(/Rabavert) for rabies and Encepur for tick-borne encephalitis (TBE) from GlaxoSmithKline (GSK). In February 2023, it was announced that Bavarian Nordic would acquire travel vaccines Vivotif for typhoid fever and Vaxchora for cholera, in addition to a late-stage candidate for chikungunya, from  Emergent BioSolutions.

Marketed products and pipeline 

Bavarian Nordic's marketed products and pipeline, as of July 2020.

Associations

Bavarian Nordic is a member of the Alliance for Biosecurity, a group of companies that work towards preventing and treating severe infectious diseases, especially those that present global security challenges.

The company is a funding partner of the Bipartisan Commission on Biodefense, and a former donor to the Bipartisan Policy Center.

References

External links

Pharmaceutical companies of Denmark
Biotechnology companies of Denmark
Danish companies established in 1994
Life science companies based in Copenhagen
Companies based in Gentofte Municipality
Pharmaceutical companies established in 1994
Companies listed on Nasdaq Copenhagen
Companies traded over-the-counter in the United States